Pirenella alata is a species of sea snail, a marine gastropod mollusk in the family Potamididae. It also lives in brackish water.

Distribution
This species occurs in the Philippines, Myanmar, India, Malaysia, Thailand, Vietnam, Singapore and Indonesia.

References

 Lozouet, P. & Plaziat, J.-C., 2008 - Mangrove environments and molluscs, Abatan river, Bohol and Panglao islands, central Philippines,, p. 1-160, 38 pls

External links
  Reid D.G. & Ozawa T. (2016). The genus Pirenella Gray, 1847 (= Cerithideopsilla Thiele, 1929) (Gastropoda: Potamididae) in the Indo-West Pacific region and Mediterranean Sea. Zootaxa. 4076(1): 1-91
 Gastropods.com: Cerithidea (Cerithideopsilla) djadjariensis

Potamididae
Gastropods described in 1849